The End of Average: How We Succeed in a World That Values Sameness is a book by Todd Rose, published by HarperCollins in 2016, that argues for design paradigms that accommodate individual differences rather than a statistical average human.

References

Further reading

External links
 

2016 non-fiction books
American non-fiction books
HarperCollins books
Psychology books
Statistics books